Bolivia competed at the 2012 Summer Olympics in London, United Kingdom from 27 July to 12 August 2012. Comité Olímpico Boliviano sent a total of 5 athletes to the Games, 3 men and 2 women, to compete only in athletics, shooting, and swimming; all of them had competed in their first Olympics. Three athletes were selected by Universality places, without having qualified. More than half of them were under the age of 25; thus, many of them were expected to reach their peak in time for the 2016 Summer Olympics in Rio de Janeiro. Freestyle swimmer Karen Torrez was the nation's flag bearer at the opening ceremony. Bolivia, however, has yet to win its first Olympic medal.

Athletics

Athletes have so far achieved qualifying standards in the following athletics events (up to a maximum of 3 athletes in each event at the 'A' Standard, and 1 at the 'B' Standard):

Key
 Note – Ranks given for track events are within the athlete's heat only
 Q = Qualified for the next round
 q = Qualified for the next round as a fastest loser or, in field events, by position without achieving the qualifying target
 NR = National record
 N/A = Round not applicable for the event
 Bye = Athlete not required to compete in round

Men

Women

Shooting

Men

Swimming

Men

Women

See also
Bolivia at the 2011 Pan American Games

References

External links

Nations at the 2012 Summer Olympics
2012
2012 in Bolivian sport